The 1956 Oklahoma A&M Cowboys football team represented Oklahoma A&M College in the 1956 NCAA University Division football season. This was the 56th year of football at A&M and the second under Cliff Speegle. The Cowboys played their home games at Lewis Field in Stillwater, Oklahoma. They finished the season 3–5–2, 2–1–1 in their final season in the Missouri Valley Conference.

Schedule

After the season

The 1957 NFL Draft was held on January 31, 1957. The following Cowboy was selected.

References

Oklahoma AandM
Oklahoma State Cowboys football seasons
Oklahoma AM